Illegal Aliens is a 2007 sci-fi/comedy B-movie starring Anna Nicole Smith and former professional wrestler Joanie Laurer. It was Smith's final film. The film received negative reviews at the time of its release.

Plot

Guided by a holographic mentor, three aliens take the form of beautiful American women in order to stop an intergalactic terrorist (Joanie Laurer), from destroying Earth.

Cast 

Anna Nicole Smith - Lucy
Joanie Laurer - Rex
Lenise Soren - Cameron
Gladys Jimenez - Drew
Patrick Burleigh - Max Sperling
Dennis Lemoine - Ray
Mark 'Woody' Keppel - Vinnie
Michael J. Valentine - Valentine
John James - Big Tony

Documentary
Director Giancola later released the self-narrated documentary Addicted to Fame (originally titled Craptastic'') about the making of the film. Composed from extensive behind-the-scenes footage, the documentary captures his struggle to complete and release the film in the long shadow of the life, times, troubles and death, of the film's star and producer, Anna Nicole Smith.

Production Information
Mary Beth French - producer
David Giancola - director, executive producer
John James - executive producer
Zorinah Juan - producer
Kevin Rapf - producer
Anna Nicole Smith - producer
Daniel Smith - associate producer
Edgewood Studios - production company
Jessica Oulton - makeup

References

External links 

 

2007 films
American science fiction comedy films
Films about extraterrestrial life
2000s English-language films
2000s American films